Spinomantis phantasticus is a species of frog in the family Mantellidae. It is endemic to east-central and northeastern Madagascar.

Description
Spinomantis phantasticus males measure  in snout–vent length. It is a very conspicuous species, presenting a distinct green-brown dorsal patterning and large spines all over the body. The ventral side as well as the femoral glands are greenish.

The male advertisement call is a sequence of 4 or 5 "metallic" double-click notes.

Habitat and conservation
It probably breeds in streams, as other species in the genus. Males call from about 2–4 m above the ground in the vegetation along streams.

This species is locally abundant. However, subsistence agriculture, timber extraction, charcoal manufacture, spread of invasive eucalyptus, livestock grazing, and expanding human settlements are threats to its habitat. It occurs in the Masoala and Marojejy National Parks.

References

phantasticus
Endemic frogs of Madagascar
Amphibians described in 1997
Taxa named by Frank Glaw
Taxa named by Miguel Vences
Taxonomy articles created by Polbot